The 1995 North Carolina Tar Heels football team represented the University of North Carolina at Chapel Hill during the 1995 NCAA Division I-A football season. The Tar Heels  played their home games at Kenan Memorial Stadium in Chapel Hill, North Carolina and competed in the Atlantic Coast Conference. The team was led by head coach Mack Brown.

Schedule

Roster

References

North Carolina
North Carolina Tar Heels football seasons
Cheez-It Bowl champion seasons
North Carolina Tar Heels football